WRD may refer to:

 Oregon Water Resources Department
 Warduji language
 Wasatch Roller Derby, a roller derby league in Salt Lake City, Utah, United States
 Watts Reflected Decimal, a type of digital code in computing
 Woodstock Roller Derby, a roller derby league in Woodstock, Ontario, Canada
 World Rabies Day, observed on 28 September
 World Radio Day, observed on 13 February
 World Refrigeration Day, observed on 26 June
 World Religion Day, observed on the third Sunday in January 
 World report on disability, a publication of the World Health Organization
 Worm Runner's Digest, a zoology journal